The 1921 Central Michigan Normalites football team represented Central Michigan Normal School, later renamed Central Michigan University, as an independent during the 1921 college football season. In their first season under head coach Wallace Parker, the Central Michigan football team compiled a 7–2–1 record and shut out eight of ten opponents. The team's victories included games with Ferris Institute (7–0 and 60–0), Olivet College (25–0), Grand Rapids Junior College (7–0), and Alma (29–0). The team also played Detroit City College to a scoreless tie and lost to the 1921 Michigan State Normal Normalites football team by a close 7–6 score.

Schedule

References

Central Michigan
Central Michigan Chippewas football seasons
Central Michigan Normalites football